Jean Emile Junior Onana Onana (born 8 January 2000) is a Cameroonian professional footballer who plays as a midfielder for Ligue 1 club Lens and the Cameroon national team.

Club career
On 31 January 2020, Onana joined Lille from Leixões. Onana made his professional debut with Lille in a 2–1 Ligue 1 loss to Marseille on 16 February 2020. In August 2020, he joined Belgian club Mouscron along with some Lille players on loan, where he received a red card in a Division A match defeat to Kortrijk on 13 September.

On 30 August 2021, Onana moved to Ligue 1 club Bordeaux on a five-year contract. On 1 September 2022, he signed for his former club Lille's rivals Lens on a five-year contract. He made his first appearance with Lens on 4 September 2023 against Reims.

International career
Onana made his Cameroon national team debut on 8 October 2020 in a friendly against Japan.

Career statistics

Honours 
Cameroon

 Africa Cup of Nations bronze: 2021

References

External links
 Clermont Foot Profile
 

2000 births
Living people
Footballers from Yaoundé
Cameroonian footballers
Cameroonian expatriate footballers
Cameroon international footballers
Association football midfielders
Lille OSC players
Leixões S.C. players
Royal Excel Mouscron players
FC Girondins de Bordeaux players
RC Lens players
Ligue 1 players
Championnat National 2 players
Ligue 2 players
Liga Portugal 2 players
Belgian Pro League players
Cameroonian expatriate sportspeople in France
Cameroonian expatriate sportspeople in Portugal
Cameroonian expatriate sportspeople in Belgium
Expatriate footballers in France
Expatriate footballers in Portugal
Expatriate footballers in Belgium
2021 Africa Cup of Nations players